Lauri Silvennoinen (November 7, 1916 – December 24, 2004) was a Finnish cross-country skier who competed in the 1940s. He was born in Kesälahti, North Karelia.

Silvennoinen won a silver medal at the 1948 Winter Olympics in St. Moritz in the 4 × 10 km relay.

Cross-country skiing results

Olympic Games
 1 medal – (1 silver)

World Championships

References

External links
Finland's 1948 Winter Olympic medals 

1916 births
2004 deaths
Cross-country skiers at the 1948 Winter Olympics
Finnish male cross-country skiers
Medalists at the 1948 Winter Olympics
Olympic cross-country skiers of Finland
Olympic medalists in cross-country skiing
Olympic silver medalists for Finland
People from Kesälahti
People from Kuopio Province (Grand Duchy of Finland)
Sportspeople from North Karelia
20th-century Finnish people